The rare spider species Tegenaria silvestris  is mostly found in caves, or on dumps; sometimes it occurs on forest edges, or in dry forests. It constructs its web under tree trunks and dead wood, and in tree caves.

It was transferred to the genus Malthonica in 2005, but back to Tegenaria in 2013.

References 

silvestris
Spiders of Europe
Spiders described in 1872